Northumberland and Hunter was an electoral district for the Legislative Assembly in the Australian state of New South Wales from 1856 to 1859, in the Newcastle area and named after Northumberland County and the Hunter River. It elected three members, with voters casting three votes and the first three candidates being elected. For the 1859 election it was replaced by Northumberland and the remainder was divided between Hunter and Lower Hunter.

Members for Northumberland and Hunter

Election results

1856

1858

References

Northumberland and Hunter
Port Stephens Council
1856 establishments in Australia
1859 disestablishments in Australia